Alessandro Gamberini (born 27 August 1981) is an Italian former former professional footballer who played as a central defender. He is working as assistant coach for Virtus Verona.

He spent most of his professional career with Fiorentina, appearing in 224 official games over the course of seven seasons. In Serie A, he also appeared for Bologna, Napoli, Genoa and Chievo.

An Italy international in the late 2000s, Gamberini represented the country at Euro 2008 and the 2009 Confederations Cup.

Club career

Bologna
In the 2000 off-season, Gamberini was acquired by Juventus F.C. alongside Alex Pederzoli and Giacomo Cipriani in a pack deal for €5.16 million, in exchange for the remaining 50% of Jonatan Binotto's registration rights for the same amount, with 50% of Gamberini's rights being priced at €2.32 million. His co-ownership deal was terminated in the favour of Bologna in June 2002, for a peppercorn fee, making the Turin side register a loss of €1.5 million (the residual unamortised transfer fee of €4.64 in three years), but with a financial income of €2.32 million as Juve did not have to pay the remaining 50% registration rights.

Fiorentina
Following Bologna's relegation in 2005, Gamberini moved to ACF Fiorentina for €3.2 million, carving a starting XI niche in his second year as the Viola eventually qualified twice for the UEFA Champions League. On 4 March 2007, he scored two goals in a 5–1 home win over Torino FC, his first in 134 professional appearances.

At the end of 2007–08, Gamberini was voted as Fiorentina's player of the campaign. In February 2010, he was sidelined for three months after undergoing shoulder surgery.

In July 2011, Gamberini became Fiorentina's new captain as Riccardo Montolivo was stripped of that role.

Napoli
In July 2012, aged 31, Gamberini signed with S.S.C. Napoli along with teammate Valon Behrami, in a combined deal of around €8.5 million. He spent 2013–14 on loan to Genoa CFC.

Chievo
On 24 July 2014, Gamberini was sold to A.C. ChievoVerona. He scored his first and only league goal for them on 11 September 2016, helping the hosts earn one point following the 1–1 home draw to Lazio.

On 3 July 2018, 36-year-old Gamberini confirmed his retirement from professional football.

International career
Gamberini was a member of the Italian under-21 team that won the 2004 UEFA European Championship under Claudio Gentile. He made his debut with the full side in a 2–0 friendly win against South Africa, on 17 October 2007.

Gamberini was not included in the original squad for UEFA Euro 2008, but was called up after captain Fabio Cannavaro tore ankle ligaments after a collision with teammate Giorgio Chiellini in training, on 2 June.

Gamberini was selected by Marcello Lippi for the 2009 FIFA Confederations Cup tournament, but once again failed to make an appearance as the nation was eliminated in the first round.

Style of play
A reliable and physically strong centre-back, Gamberini was known in particular for his tackling ability and aerial prowess.

Coaching career
In July 2020, he was hired by Serie C club Virtus Verona as assistant coach.

Career statistics

Club

International

Honours
Italy U21
 UEFA European Under-21 Championship: 2004

References

External links
 
 
 National team data  
 

1981 births
2009 FIFA Confederations Cup players
A.C. ChievoVerona players
ACF Fiorentina players
Association football defenders
Bologna F.C. 1909 players
Genoa C.F.C. players
Hellas Verona F.C. players
Italian footballers
Italy international footballers
Italy under-21 international footballers
Italy youth international footballers
Living people
S.S.C. Napoli players
Serie A players
Serie B players
Footballers from Bologna
UEFA Euro 2008 players